Svetlana Petko (born June 6, 1970) is a former international Russian football goalkeeper. She played for Lehenda Chernihiv, Interros Moskva and CSK VVS Samara throughout her career, winning four Russian leagues.

She is the most capped Russian female player, with 144 appearances for the Soviet and Russian national teams. She was Russia's first-choice goalkeeper in the 1999 and Alla Volkova's reserve in the 2003 World Cup.

She is currently the manager of ShVSM Izmailovo in the Russian league.

References

1970 births
Living people
Soviet women's footballers
Russian women's footballers
WFC Lehenda-ShVSM Chernihiv players
FIFA Century Club
Soviet Union women's international footballers
Russia women's international footballers
2003 FIFA Women's World Cup players
Women's association football goalkeepers
1999 FIFA Women's World Cup players
Dual internationalists (women's football)
CSK VVS Samara (women's football club) players
Russian Women's Football Championship players